Peter Joffre Swales (5 June 1948 – 15 April 2022) was a Welsh "guerilla historian of psychoanalysis and former assistant to the Rolling Stones". He called himself "the punk historian of psychoanalysis", and he is well known for his essays on Sigmund Freud.  A 1998 article in The New York Times Magazine noted his "remarkable detective work over the last 25 years, revealing the true identities of several early patients of Freud's who had been known only by their pseudonyms." He is one of three men (the others are Freud Archives director Kurt R. Eissler and psychoanalyst Jeffrey Masson) whose machinations are described in the 1984 book In the Freud Archives, which originated as two articles in The New Yorker magazine that provoked Masson to file an unsuccessful $10 million libel suit against the magazine and its writer Janet Malcolm.

Swales "became notorious when, in 1981, he maintained that Freud had had a secret affair with his wife Martha’s younger sister Minna Bernays ... and had arranged for her to have an abortion after she became pregnant".

In 1995, Swales sent a petition, for which he had acquired nearly 50 signatories, to the Library of Congress expressing concern that its planned Freud exhibition was not sufficiently critical of Freud — that it did not "suitably portray the present status of knowledge and adequately reflect the full spectrum of informed opinion about the status of Freud's contribution to intellectual history." Following the petition, the Library postponed the exhibition, invited Freud critics to participate, and opened the exhibition in 1998.

In 1998, Swales discovered the true identity of the pseudonymous "Sybil", who was alleged to have had multiple personalities.

Swales died at his home near Izmir, Turkey on 15 April 2022, where he had lived since 2007. He had moved there from Mott Street in lower Manhattan, where he'd lived for the previous 35 years. He died from "a short illness and infection." He is survived by his wife Julia and by his two sisters, Patricia Barker Swales and Freda Swales.

Literature 
Peter J. Swales, "Freud, Minna Bernays, and the Conquest of Rome: New Light on the Origins of Psychoanalysis," The New American Review (Spring/Summer 1982), pp. 1–23.
Peter J. Swales, "A Fascination with Witches: Medieval tales of torture altered the course of psychoanalysis," The Sciences, vol. 22, no. 8 (November 1982), pp. 21–25.
Janet Malcolm, In the Freud Archives, New York: Alfred A. Knopf, 1984, . Reissued in 2002 with an afterword by Janet Malcolm by New York Review Books, 
Peter J. Swales, "The Freud Archives,"The New York Review of Books, October 24, 1985 (letter to the editor). 
Peter J. Swales, "Freud, His Teacher, and the Birth of Psychoanalysis," Freud: Appraisals and Reappraisals, Contributions to Freud Studies, Volume 1, edited by Paul Stepansky, Hillsdale, NJ: The Analytic Press, 1986. 
Peter J. Swales, "Freud, Katharina, and the First 'Wild Analysis,'" Freud: Appraisals and Reappraisals, Contributions to Freud Studies, Volume 3, edited by Paul Stepansky, Hillsdale, NJ: The Analytic Press, 1988. 
Peter J. Swales, "Freud's Master Hysteric," Unauthorized Freud: Doubters Confront a Legend, edited by Frederick C. Crews, New York: Viking Penguin, 1988. 
Peter J. Swales, "Protecting Freud's Image From Sigmund," Los Angeles Times (May 8, 1988) (review of Gay, Peter, Freud: A Life for Our Time, New York: W.W. Norton, 1988).
Peter J. Swales, "Freud, Cocaine, and Sexual Chemistry: The Role of Cocaine in Freud's Conception of the Libido," Sigmund Freud: Critical Assessments, London and New York: Routledge, Laurence Spurling, ed., vol. 1 (1989), pp. 273–301.
Peter J. Swales, "Freud, Fliess, and Fratricide: The Role of Fliess in Freud's Conception of Paranoia," Sigmund Freud: Critical Assessments, London and New York: Routledge, Laurence Spurling, ed., vol. 1 (1989), pp. 302–330.
Peter J. Swales, "Freud, Johann Weier, and the Status of Seduction: The Role of the Witch in the Conception of Fantasy," Sigmund Freud: Critical Assessments, London and New York: Routledge, Laurence Spurling, ed., vol. 1 (1989), pp. 331–358.
Peter J. Swales, "Freud, Krafft-Ebing, and the Witches: The Role of Krafft-Ebing in Freud's Flight into Fantasy," Sigmund Freud: Critical Assessments, London and New York: Routledge, Laurence Spurling, ed., vol. 1 (1989), pp. 359–365.
Peter J. Swales, "Reading Freud," The Times Literary Supplement, August 3–9, 1990, p. 823 (letter to the editor).
Peter J. Swales, "What Jung Didn't Say," Harvest: Journal for Jungian Studies, vol. 38 (1992), pp. 30–37.
Peter J. Swales, "Once a cigar, always a cigar," Nature, vol. 378 (2 November 1995), pp. 107–108 (review of Webster, Richard, Why Freud Was Wrong: Sin, Science and Psychoanalysis, HarperCollins/Basic Books, 1995).
Peter J. Swales, "Freud, Filthy Lucre, and Undue Influence," Review of Existential Psychology & Psychiatry, vol. XXIII, nos. 1, 2, & 3 (1997), pp. 115–141.
Peter L. Rudnytsky, "Peter J. Swales: Sovereign unto Myself," in Psychoanalytic Conversations: Interviews with Clinicians, Commentators, and Critics, Hillsdale, NJ: The Analytic Press, 2000. 
Peter J. Swales, "Freud, Death and Sexual Pleasures: On the Psychical Mechanism of Dr. Sigm. Freud," Arc de Cercle, vol. 1, no. 1 (January 2003).
Malcolm Macmillan and Peter J. Swales, "Observations from the Refuse-Heap: Freud, Michelangelo's Moses, and Psychoanalysis," American Imago, vol. 60, no. 1 (Spring 2003).

References 

1948 births
2022 deaths
20th-century Welsh historians
People from Haverfordwest